On the Sun is the second album by New Zealand reggae band The Black Seeds released in 2004. It includes the song "On The Sun" which debuted at number 3 on the New Zealand Charts

Track listing 

 "Tuk Tuk"
 "Turn It Around"
 "Bring You Up"
 "Sort It Out"
 "So True"
 "Fire"
 "Lets Get Down"
 "Shazzy Dub"
 "You Get Me"
 "Senegal Champions Of Africa"
 "On the Sun"

Certifications

References

2004 albums
The Black Seeds albums